Timothy Donald Von Dohlen is an American former politician.

Van Dohlen was first elected to the Texas House of Representatives in 1970, and held the 42nd house district seat for a single two-year term. He then represented the 39th house district for five consecutive terms, until 1983. Von Dohlen returned to state house from 1991 to 1993, as the legislator from the 31st district. Throughout his tenure as a state legislator, Von Dohlen was affiliated with the Democratic Party and lived in Goliad.

References

Living people
Year of birth missing (living people)
Democratic Party members of the Texas House of Representatives
People from Goliad, Texas
20th-century American politicians
Place of birth missing (living people)